Conrado Roura (born 28 February 1996) is an Argentine rugby union player, currently playing for the Dallas Jackals in Major League Rugby (MLR) in the United States. He also plays for Súper Liga Americana de Rugby side Peñarol. His preferred position is flanker.

Professional career
Roura signed for Súper Liga Americana de Rugby side Peñarol ahead of the 2021 Súper Liga Americana de Rugby season. He had previously agreed to join Dallas Jackals in Major League Rugby, before the withdrew from the 2021 season. He previously represented Argentina Sevens at 13 competitions between 2017 and 2018.

References

External links
itsrugby.co.uk Profile

1996 births
Living people
Argentine rugby union players
Rugby union flankers
Dogos XV players
Peñarol Rugby players
Dallas Jackals players